Aybaşı is a village in the Düzce District of Düzce Province in Turkey. Its population is 218 (2022).

References

Villages in Düzce District